S Muscae  is a classical (δ) Cepheid variable star in the constellation Musca about 2,600 light years away.

S Muscae is a yellow supergiant ranging between spectral types F6Ib and G0Ib and magnitudes 5.89 to 6.49 over a period of 9.66 days.  It is a luminous star around six times as massive as the Sun and 65.1 times the radius of the Sun. It is a binary star with a blue-white main sequence star companion likely to be of spectral type B3V to B5V with a mass of just over five solar masses, one of the hottest and brightest companions of a Cepheid known. The two stars orbit each other every 505 days.

S Muscae has been found to lie within the faint star cluster ASCC 69.

References

Musca (constellation)
Classical Cepheid variables
Muscae, S
4645
106111
059551
CD-69 00977
Binary stars